Dhakuria Assembly constituency was a Legislative Assembly constituency of South 24 Parganas district in the Indian state of West Bengal.

Overview
As a consequence of the orders of the Delimitation Commission, Dhakuria Assembly constituency ceases to exist from 2011.
 
It was part of Kolkata Dakshin (Lok Sabha constituency).
Before 2011, Dhakuria Assembly constituency was composed of the following: Ward Nos. 91, 92, 93, 96, 99, 100 of Kolkata Municipal Corporation.

Members of Legislative Assembly

Election results

1977-2006
In the 2006 state assembly elections, Kshiti Goswami of RSP won the 151 Dhakuria assembly seat defeating his nearest rival Sougata Roy of Trinamool Congress. Sougata Roy of Trinamool Congress defeated, Kshiti Goswami of RSP in 2001. Kshiti Goswami of RSP defeated Sukhendu Sekhar Roy of Congress in 1996 and Jatin Chakraborty, Independent, in 1991. Jatin Chakraborty of RSP defeated Shankar Kanti Bhowmick of Congress in 1987, Tushar Kanti Dasgupta of Congress in 1982 and Arabinda Prasad Dasgupta of Congress in 1977.

1967-1972
Somnath Lahiri of CPI won the Dhakuria seat in 1972, 1971, 1969 and 1967. Prior to the seat did not exist.

References

Former assembly constituencies of West Bengal
Politics of South 24 Parganas district